Edward Cecil-Smith was a Canadian communist, propagandist and soldier who fought in the Spanish civil war as a member of the Mackenzie–Papineau Battalion.

References

Armstong, Mark, and Mark Leier, “Canadians in the Spanish Civil War 1936-1938,” The Beaver 77, no. 5 (1997): 19–26.

External links

Canadian soldiers
Canadian communists
1903 births
1963 deaths
Foreign volunteers in the Spanish Civil War
Canadian expatriates in China